The French Parliament is the bicameral legislature of the French Republic, consisting of the Senate and the National Assembly.

Each house has its own regulations and rules of procedure. However, occasionally they may meet as a single house known as the Congress of the French Parliament, convened at the Palace of Versailles, to revise and amend the Constitution of France.

History and name 
The French Parliament, as a legislative body, should not be confused with the various parlements of the Ancien Régime in France, which were courts of justice and tribunals with certain political functions varying from province to province and as to whether the local law was written and Roman, or customary common law.

The word "Parliament", in the modern meaning of the term, appeared in France in the 19th century, at the time of the constitutional monarchy of 1830–1848. It is never mentioned in any constitutional text until the Constitution of the 4th Republic in 1948. Before that time, reference was made to "les Chambres"  or to each assembly, whatever its name, but never to a generic term as in Britain. Its form – unicameral, bicameral, or multicameral – and its functions have varied throughout the different political regimes and according to the various French constitutions:

Election of representatives 
The current Parliament is composed of two chambers: the upper Senate and the lower National Assembly, which have 349 and 577 members respectively.

Deputies, who sit in the National Assembly, are elected by first past the post voting in two rounds for a term of five years, notwithstanding a dissolution of the Assembly. Each constituency has around 100,000 residents, though some variance of size exists between rural and urban constituencies. For example, the Val-d'Oise constituency has 188,000 electors, while Lozère has just 34,000.

Senators are elected by indirect universal suffrage by the grands électeurs, who consist of deputies, regional councillors, departmental councillors and representatives of municipal councillors. The latter constitute 95% of the electoral body.

Organization and powers 
Normally, the parliament meets for a single nine-month session each year but under special circumstances the President of France can call an additional session. Parliamentary power was limited after the establishment of the Fourth Republic; however, the National Assembly can still cause a government to fall if an absolute majority of the legislators votes for a motion of no confidence. As a result, the government usually consists of members from the political party that dominates the Assembly and must be supported by a majority there to prevent a vote of no-confidence.

The Prime Minister and other government Ministers are appointed by the President, who is under no constitutional or other mandatory obligation to make governmental appointments from the ranks of the majority party in parliament. This is a safeguard that was introduced by the founder of the Fifth Republic, Charles de Gaulle, to attempt to prevent the disarray and horse-trading seen in the parliamentary regimes of the Third and Fourth Republics; however, in practice the prime minister and other ministers usually do belong to the majority party. A notable exception to this custom occurred during Nicolas Sarkozy's premiership when he appointed socialist ministers and Secretary of State-level junior ministers to his government. The rare periods during which the president is not from the same political party as the prime minister are usually known as cohabitation. The Cabinet of Ministers is led by the President rather than the Prime Minister.

The government (or, when it sits in session every Wednesday, the cabinet) exerts considerable influence on the agenda of Parliament. The government can link its term to a legislative text which it proposes, and unless a motion of censure is introduced within 24 hours of the proposal and passed within 48 hours of introduction – thus full procedures last at most 72 hours – the text is considered adopted without a vote. However, this procedure was limited by a 2008 constitutional amendment. Legislative initiative rests with the National Assembly.

Legislators enjoy parliamentary immunity. Both assemblies have committees that write reports on a variety of topics. If necessary, they can establish parliamentary commissions of inquiry with broad investigative power. However, this is almost never exercised because the majority can reject a proposition by the opposition to create an investigatory commission. Also, such a commission may only be created if it does not interfere with a judicial investigation, meaning that in order to cancel its creation, one just needs to press charges on the topic concerned by the investigatory commission. Since 2008, the opposition may impose the creation of an investigative commission once a year, even against the wishes of the majority. However, they still cannot lead investigations if there is a judicial case in process already (or that starts after the commission is formed).

List

See also
 Constitution of France
 Government of France
 History of France
 Politics of France
Member of Parliament (France)
List of French legislatures

Notes

References

 This article is based mainly on the article Parlement français from the French Wikipedia, Retrieved 13 October 2006.

Further reading
 Frank R. Baumgartner, "Parliament's Capacity to Expand Political Controversy in France", Legislative Studies Quarterly, Vol. 12, No. 1 (Feb. 1987), pp. 33–54. JSTOR: 440044
 Marc Abélès, Un ethnologue à l'Assemblée. Paris: Odile Jacob, 2000. An anthropological study of the French National Assembly, of its personnel, lawmakers, codes of behaviors and rites.

External links
  
 Site of the CHPP (Comité d'histoire parlementaire et politique) and of  Parlement(s), Revue d'histoire politique 

 
Law of France
Government of France
France
Politics of France
France
France